Val Kalei Kanuha is a scholar, teacher, and activist on gender violence, anti-oppression, and social justice focused on Native Hawaiian/indigenous peoples, people of color and LGBTQ communities.

Early life and education 
Kanuha was born and raised in Hilo, Hawaii, United States, in the 1950s. Her Nisei mother is the daughter of a Japanese picture bride and her father is Kanaka Maoli both born and spent their entire lives in Hawaii. Kanuha received her bachelor's degree in Social Work from the University of Wisconsin , Masters in Social Work (MSW) from the University of Minnesota  and her PhD in social welfare from the University of Washington's (UW) School of Social Work.

Teaching 
Kanuha has been a national and international trainer, advisor and consultant on anti-oppression, social justice, and gender violence issues. She taught at Hunter College in the 1990s. From 1997 to 2016, after receiving her PhD,  Kanuha taught social work, sociology and women's studies courses at the University of Hawai’i at Manoa (UH)   Much of her teaching and research focuses on sexual assault and intimate partner violence, designing culturally-based interventions based on Native Hawaiian traditions and practices, partner violence in womenʻs same-sex relationships, historical/cultural trauma, and alternative justice approaches (transformative and restorative justice). In 2017, she left her position as a professor in the Sociology Department at UH and joined the UW School of Social Work as Assistant Dean for Field Education. She is currently Assistant Dean for Diversity, Equity and Inclusion, and teaches qualitative research, gender violence, historical trauma, and other social work courses .

Activism 
Kanuha was an early activist and organizer in the U.S. based battered womenʻs movement in the early 1970s . She is one of the founding members of an early coalition in the battered women's movement starting in the Twin Cities, that helped open Women's Advocates, considered one of the first domestic violence shelters in the U.S.  She co-founded the University of Hawai’i at the Hilo Women's Center, which provides a space for women to discuss the intersections of feminism, racism, ethnicity, indigeneity, class and other systems of hierarchy and conceptualizations. She was also a co-founder of the Asian Pacific Islander Center on HIV/AIDS in New York . She is a founding member of Incite! Women of Color Against Violence, an organization of queer, feminist and indigenous women of color whose work has greatly contributed to fighting State and interpersonal violence against women, gender, non-conforming, and trans people of color. Kanuha is currently a national Board member  of the Joyful Heart Foundation founded in 2004 by advocate and actor Mariska Hargitay of Law and Order: SVU, and board member with API Chaya in Seattle . Kanuha has been actively involved in local and national advocacy and social justice on behalf of Hawaiian, indigenous, and people of color

Personal life
Kanuha met her partner, Kata, in 1993, and together they adopted their daughter, Anela Roshan in 2013.

Articles and other works 
Colonization and Violence Against Women, 2002
Transcript of Panel on Colonization, Culture, and Resistance, 2015
Relationships So Loving and So Hurtful": The Constructed Duality of Sexual and Racial/Ethnic Intimacy in the Context of Violence in Asian and Pacific Islander Lesbian and Queer Women's Relationships, 2013
Strange Bedfellows: Feminist Advocates and U.S. Marines Working to End Violence, 2004
The Use of Temporary Restraining Orders (TROs) as a Strategy to Address Intimate Partner Violence, 2004
HIV and women in Hawaii: risk and protective factors in HIV/AIDS prevention, 2003
The impact of sexuality and race/ethnicity on HIV/AIDS risk among Asian and Pacific Island American (A/PIA) gay and bisexual men in Hawai'i, 2001
"Being" Native versus "Going Native": Conducting Social Work Research as an Insider, 2000
The social process of "passing" to manage stigma: Acts of internalized oppression or acts of resistance? (1999)
Local and gay: addressing the health needs of Asian and Pacific Islander American (A/PIA) lesbians and gay men in Hawaii (1999)

References

American activists
Year of birth missing (living people)
Native Hawaiian people
University of Hawaiʻi faculty
Indigenous rights activists
Living people